Arati Saha (24 September 1940 – 23 August 1994) was an Indian-Bengali long-distance swimmer, best known for becoming the first Asian woman to swim across the English Channel on 29 September 1959 at nineteen years old. In 1960, she became the first Indian sportswoman to be awarded the Padma Shri, the fourth-highest civilian honour in India.

Early life 
Gupta came from a middle-class family. She was born in Kolkata, India as the second of three children and the first of two daughters to Panchugopal Saha in 1940. Her father was an employee in the armed forces. At the age of two and half, she lost her mother. Her elder brother and younger sister Bharati were raised at their maternal uncle's house, while she was raised by her grandmother in North Kolkata. At the age of four, she accompanied her uncle to the Champatala Ghat bath, where she learned to swim. Noticing his daughter's interest in swimming, Panchugopal Saha enrolled his daughter in the Hatkhola Swimming Club. In 1946, at the age of five, she won the gold medal in 110 yards freestyle at the Shailendra Memorial Swimming Competition, beginning her swimming career.

Career

State, national sports and Olympics 
Between 1945 and 1951, she won 22 state-level competitions in West Bengal. Her main events were 100-metre freestyle, 200 metres breaststroke and 300 metres breaststroke. She came second only to Dolly Nazir of Bombay. In 1948, she participated in the national championship held at Mumbai. She won silver in 100 metres freestyle and 200 metres breaststroke, and won bronze in 200 metres freestyle. She made an all-India record in 1950. At the 1951 West Bengal state meet, she clocked 1 minute 37.6 seconds in 100 metres breaststroke and broke Dolly Nazir's all-India record. At the same meet, she set the new state-level record in 100 metres freestyle, 200 metres freestyle, and 100 metres backstroke.

She represented India at the 1952 Summer Olympics along with compatriot Dolly Nazir. She was one of the four women participants and the youngest member of the Indian contingent at the age of 12. At the Olympics, she took part in 200 metres breast stroke event. At the heats she clocked 3 minutes 40.8 seconds. After returning from the Olympics, she lost in 100 metres freestyle to her sister Bharati Saha. After the loss, she concentrated only on breast stroke.

Crossing the English Channel 
She used to participate in long-distance swimming competitions in the Ganges. Arati was inspired to cross the English Channel by Brojen Das. At the 1958 Butlin International Cross Channel Swimming Race, Brojen Das became the first among the men and earned the distinction of being the first person from the Indian subcontinent to cross the English Channel. Greta Andersen, a Danish-born female swimmer from the United States, clocked 11 hours and 1 minute and stood first among both men and women. She proposed the name of Arati to the organizers of the Butlin International Cross Channel Swimming Race for the next year's event.

Dr. Arun Gupta, the assistant executive secretary of Hatkhola Swimming Club took the initiative in organising Arati's participation at the event. He organised exhibits of Arati's swimming prowess as part of a fundraising programme. Jamininath Das, Gour Mukherjee and Parimal Saha also provided their help in organising Arati's trip. At this point, Sambhunath Mukherjee and Ajay Ghoshal took up the matter with Dr. Bidhan Chandra Roy, the Chief Minister of West Bengal. He arranged a grant of  11,000. Jawahar Lal Nehru, the Prime Minister of India also showed interest in Arati's endeavour.

While the logistics of her trip were being arranged, Arati began swimming for long hours. On 13 April 1959, Arati swam continuously for eight hours at the pond in Deshbandhu Park. On 24 July 1959, she left for England along with her manager Dr. Arun Gupta. She started her final practice in the English Channel on the 13th of August. During this time, she was mentored by Dr. Bimal Chandra, who was also participating in the 1959 Butlin International Cross Channel Swimming Race.

A total of 58 participants including five women from 23 countries took part in the competition. The race was scheduled for 27 August 1959 at 1 am local time from Cape Gris Nez, France to Sandgate, England. However, the pilot boat of Arati Saha did not arrive in time. By 11 am, she had swum more than 40 miles and came within 5 miles of the England coast. At that point, she faced a current from the opposite direction. As a result, by 4 pm, she could only swim about two more miles, before she had to quit.

Arati prepared herself for a second attempt. Her manager Dr. Arun Gupta was ill, but she carried on with her practice. On 29 September 1959, she made her second attempt. Starting from Cape Gris Nez, France, she swam for 16 hours and 20 minutes, battling tough waves and covered 42 miles to reach Sandgate, England. On reaching the coast of England, she hoisted the Indian flag. The prominent Indian politician Vijaylakshmi Pandit was the first to congratulate her.

Later life 
Arati completed her Intermediate from City College. In 1959, under the supervision of Dr. Bidhan Chandra Roy, she married her manager Dr. Arun Gupta. First they had a court marriage and later a social marriage. Her in-law's house was in Tarak Chatterjee Lane, very near to her grandmother's house. After marriage, she had a daughter named Archana. She was employed in Bengal Nagpur Railway. On 4 August 1994, she was admitted to a private nursing home in Kolkata with jaundice and encephalitis. She died as a result of the illness after 19 days, on 23 August 1994.

Honours and awards 
She was awarded Padma Shri in 1960. She was the first Indian woman sportsperson to receive the award. In 1999, the Department of Posts introduced a postage stamp of her which was  3 denomination. In 1996, a bust of Arati Saha was erected near her residence. The 100-metre long lane in front of the bust was renamed after her. On the day that would have been her 80th birthday in 2020, she was featured as a Google Doodle.

See also 
 Mihir Sen
 Brojen Das
 Bula Choudhury

References

External links
 

1940 births
1994 deaths
Indian female swimmers
Recipients of the Padma Shri in sports
Sportspeople from Kolkata
Female long-distance swimmers
English Channel swimmers
Sportswomen from Kolkata
Olympic swimmers of India
Swimmers at the 1952 Summer Olympics
20th-century Indian women
20th-century Indian people
Swimmers from West Bengal